The Road Traffic Act 1934 was an Act of the Parliament of the United Kingdom introduced by the Minister of Transport, Leslie Hore-Belisha. The Act was made in a year in which there had been a record numbers of road casualties.

Context
The Locomotive Acts of the late 1800s had placed heavy restrictions on speeds of "locomotives". Under pressure from an emerging motor industry and growing enthusiasm for motor cars the Locomotives on Highways Act 1896 had reduced the restrictions and increased speed limits. Speed limits were again raised by the Motor Car Act 1903 which also introduced requirements for registration of vehicles and for driving licenses as well as new safety legislation. The Road Traffic Act 1930 had controversially removed all speed limits for motorcars in a year with record 7,305 road fatalities since which the levels of fatalities had increased to 7,343 deaths and 231,603 injuries. Half the deaths were of pedestrians, and of these three-quarters occurred in built-up areas. Hore-Belisha spoke of this as "mass murder" and he was nearly killed shortly after his appointment during a public-relations exercise to demonstrate how to use the new "uncontrolled crossings" when a car sped through the crossing without stopping. The Pedestrian's Association had been set up in 1929 to advocate on behalf of pedestrians with the Automobile Association and Royal Automobile Club resisting further legislation. The Salter Report which had been commissioned by the government was published in 1933 and recommended changes to the funding of both road and rail transport.

Clauses
The Act:
Reintroduced a speed limit for cars, of 30mph in built-up areas, reversing the removal of speed limits only 4 years earlier by the Road Traffic Act 1930.
The UK driving test was made compulsory for all new drivers from 1 June 1935.
Strengthened legislation relating to insurance for drivers.

Legacy
The Belisha beacon, named after the Transport Minister, was introduced to clearly identify crossings. The 30 mph speed limit in urban areas remains the most common speed limit (as of 2015).

See also
Locomotives on Highways Act 1896
Motor Car Act 1903
Roads Act 1920
Road Traffic Act 1930
Road Traffic Act 1988
Road speed limits in the United Kingdom

Notes

References
References for notes above
  

Other references

1934 in law
Automotive safety
Roads in the United Kingdom
United Kingdom Acts of Parliament 1934
1934 in transport
Transport policy in the United Kingdom
Road safety in the United Kingdom
Driving in the United Kingdom
History of transport in the United Kingdom
Transport legislation